Simon-Kucher & Partners is a global strategy consulting firm with offices in 30 countries. Founded in 1985, the firm focuses on growth strategy, marketing, pricing, and sales.

Background

Simon-Kucher & Partners was founded by Hermann Simon and his doctoral students, Eckhard Kucher and Karl-Heinz Sebastian, in Bonn in 1985. At the time, Simon was a professor at the University of Bielefeld. 

In 1996, Simon-Kucher & Partners became the first independent German consultancy to establish a subsidiary abroad when the firm opened an office in Cambridge, Massachusetts. This was the beginning of Simon-Kucher & Partners' international expansion with new offices opening annually, starting with Paris, Zurich, Tokyo, and Munich. The firm is led by a board, consisting of nine partners from different countries and offices. Mark Billige and Andreas von der Gathen are the company's co-CEOs since January 1, 2020.  Dr. Georg Tacke was CEO since 2009, when Hermann Simon stepped down as board chairman, a position that he had held since 1995.

References

External links
Simon, Kucher & Partners 

International management consulting firms
1985 establishments in Germany